Minuscule 62 (in the Gregory-Aland numbering), α 453 (Soden), is a Greek minuscule manuscript of the New Testament, on paper leaves. Palaeographically it has been assigned to the 14th century. Formerly it was labelled by 62a and 65p. It was adapted for liturgical use. The manuscript is lacunose.

Description 

The codex contains the text of the Acts of the Apostles, Catholic epistles, and Pauline epistles on 135 paper leaves (size ) with two lacunae (Acts 1:1-7:34; 13:21-25). The text is written in one column per page, 35 lines per page.

Hebrews is placed before 1 Timothy.

Text 

Kurt Aland the Greek text of the codex did not place in any of his Categories.

History 

The manuscript came from the East. The manuscript once belonged to the Colbert,s collection. It was examined by Wettstein, Griesbach, and Scholz.
Formerly it was labelled by 62a and 65p. In 1908 Gregory gave for it number 62.

Currently it is housed at the Bibliothèque nationale de France (Gr. 60), at Paris.

See also 

 List of New Testament minuscules
 Biblical manuscript
 Textual criticism

References

Further reading 

 J. J. Griesbach, Symbolae criticae ad supplendas et corrigendas variarum Nouveau Testament lectionum collectiones (Halle, 1793), p. 166, 188.

Greek New Testament minuscules
14th-century biblical manuscripts
Bibliothèque nationale de France collections